Noah Rod (born 7 June 1996) is a Swiss professional ice hockey right winger who currently serves as captain of Genève-Servette HC of the National League (NL). Rod was selected by the Sharks in the second round (53rd overall) of the 2014 NHL Entry Draft.

Playing career
Rod made his National League A debut playing with Genève-Servette HC during the 2013–14 NLA season, signing a one-year contract. In 2014, he was selected by the San Jose Sharks in the second round (53rd overall) of the 2014 NHL Entry Draft.

On 5 October 2016, Rod agreed to a five-year contract extension with Geneva with an NHL-out clause.

At the conclusion of Genève-Servette's 2016–17 season after a first round sweep in the post-season, Rod used his out-clause in signing a three-year entry-level contract with the San Jose Sharks of the National Hockey League on 23 March 2017. After sorting out immigration visa issues, Rod was assigned to affiliate for the playoff run of  the San Jose Barracuda of the American Hockey League (AHL).

At the end of the 2016–17 season, Rod stated that he would no longer play in the AHL, considering the league too weak compared to the National League. Should he not make the Sharks roster at the end of training camp, he would then rejoin Genève-Servette. After participating in the Sharks training camp and pre-season, Rod was reassigned on loan back to Genève-Servette on 25 September 2017. In the off-season following the 2017–18 season, Rod was placed on unconditional waivers and mutually terminated his contract with the Sharks on July 17, 2018, after he refused to play in the AHL. That same day, he was named captain of Genève-Servette HC and signed through the 2023–24 season with the team.

On September 16, 2019, Rod was suspended for 2 games and fined CHF 3,900 after an illegal check against SCL Tigers's Loic In-Albon during the first regular season game on September 14, 2019.

On January 17, 2020, Rod was suspended for 4 games and fined CHF 6,400 following a hit to the head of Alessio Bertaggia in a game against HC Lugano on January 14, 2020.

International play

Rod represented the Swiss National junior team at multiple tournaments. The first time he was selected to play for Switzerland men's national team, was during the 2016 Deutschland Cup.

Rod won silver with Switzerland at the 2018 IIHF World Championship in Denmark. He appeared in all 10 games of the tournament (0 point). The next year, Rod was also named to the team for the 2019 IIHF World Championship in Slovakia.

Personal life
Rod is the son of former National League player Jean-Luc Rod who spent most of his career with HC Fribourg-Gottéron.

His brother, Julien, is currently playing with the Drummondville Voltigeurs of the Quebec Major Junior Hockey League (QMJHL).

Career statistics

Regular season and playoffs

International

References

External links

1996 births
Living people
Swiss expatriate ice hockey people
Genève-Servette HC players
San Jose Barracuda players
San Jose Sharks draft picks
Swiss expatriate sportspeople in the United States
Swiss ice hockey right wingers
People from La Chaux-de-Fonds
Sportspeople from the canton of Neuchâtel